Teika may refer to:

 Teika, a neighbourhood of Riga, Latvia
 Fujiwara no Teika, a Japanese scholar of the late Heian and early Kamakura periods
 8305 Teika, a main-belt asteroid